Isabelle Émilie de Tessier (1847 – 1890) who worked under the pseudonym Marie Duval, was a French cartoonist, known as co-creator of the seminal cartoon character Ally Sloper.

Biography
Tessier was one of the first female cartoonists in Europe, and one of four female contributors to the British satirical magazine Judy, edited by her husband Charles Henry Ross (with whom she created Ally Sloper in the 14 August 1867 issue). In addition to the Ally Sloper comic strips, Duval produced numerous spot illustrations, cartoons and full-page comic strips for the magazine during the mid-nineteenth century. In 1884, when the Ally Sloper character was given his own magazine, Duval's comic strips were reprinted without her signature.

Her work also appeared in British penny papers and comics from the 1860s to the 1880s. 

Duval was also the author of Queens and Kings and Other Things (1874), a collection of illustrated nonsense verse published under the pseudonym of "Princess Hesse Schwartzbourg".

Duval was also an actress in the English theatre.

References

Sources

 Ally Sloper Don Markstein's Toonopedia
 Ally Sloper Andy's Early Comics Archive

External links
 Top hats off to Marie Duval, a lost Victorian cartoonist sensation The Guardian, 27 Oct 2014
 The Marie Duval Archive

1847 births
1890 deaths
19th-century French women artists
French cartoonists
French women cartoonists
French comics artists
French female comics artists